Beyond the Sea is the fifth full-length album by Spanish neo-classical metal band Dark Moor.

Recorded in 2004, it was released in early 2005. It is the band's first record to feature new bassist Dani Fernández. The song "Beyond the Sea" was featured on a compilation in the memory of producer Big Simon.

Track listing
 "Before the Duel" - 3:50
 "Miracles" - 6:11
 "Houdini's Great Escapade" - 4:59
 "Through the Gates of the Silver Key" - 0:52
 "The Silver Key" - 6:15
 "Green Eyes" - 4:36
 "Going On" - 4:41
 "Beyond the Sea" - 3:57
 "Julius Caesar (Interlude)" - 2:23
 "Alea Jacta" - 5:01
 "Vivaldi's Winter (Bonus track)", (includes 2-minute silence and a hidden piano-only track) - 7:40
 "Innocence" (Japanese bonus track) - 4:06

Personnel 
 Alfred Romero - vocals & choirs, acoustic guitars
 Enrik García - guitars, guttural voice
 Dani Fernández - bass
 Andy C. - drums, piano

Additional musicians 
 Dobrin Ionela - choirs 
 Mamen Castaño - choirs 
 Nacho Ruiz - choirs    
 José Garrido - choirs  
 Kiko Hagall - choirs   
 Marcial Ortiz - choirs 
 Juan Vidal - choirs    
 Elena Canales - choirs 
 Lucia Ribera - choirs  
 Tina Alonso - choirs   
 Yolanda Alonso - choirs

Concepts
 "The Silver Key" is based on the "Dreamlands" of H. P. Lovecraft.
 "Green Eyes" is based on the story of Gustavo Adolfo Bécquer (Spanish poet 1836-1870)
 "Julius Caesar" and "Alea Jacta" are based on Julius Caesar, a Roman military and political leader.
 "Vivaldi's Winter" is a metal version of an Antonio Lucio Vivaldi's composition. This track includes a silence about 5 min 40 sec in between "Vivaldi's Winter" and "noname Piano Music".

References

2005 albums
Dark Moor albums